The Kurmangazy oil field is an offshore oil field located in the Kazakh section of the Caspian Sea on the maritime border between Russia and Kazakhstan, about  west of the Buzachi Peninsula. It is expected to be the third largest oil field of Kazakhstan.  The field is named after Kurmangazy Sagyrbayuly.

History
The first agreement concerning Kurmangazy field was signed in 2002. The US$23 billion worth PSA agreement was signed with KazMunayGas and Rosneft on 6 June 2005.  In May 2006, the first well was drilled into the structure; however, it failed to strike oil.

Reserves

Operator
The field is operated by Kurmangazy Petroleum Company. KazMunayTeniz, a subsidiary of KazMunayGas, owns 50% of the project and RN – Kazakhstan LLС, a subsidiary of Rosneft, owns 25%.  Originally, 25% of shares was assigned to Zarubezhneft, but later Rosneft received  the option on this remaining stake once commercial extraction commences.  Total S.A. and ONGC have shown interest to join the project.

See also

 Energy in Kazakhstan

References

External links
 Kurmangazy Structure (Rosneft's website)
 Kurmangazy (KazMunayGas' website)

Oil fields of Kazakhstan
Geography of Kazakhstan
Caspian Sea
Rosneft